Joseph Leonard Tillinghast (May 18, 1790 – December 30, 1844) was a U.S. Representative from Rhode Island, cousin of Thomas Tillinghast.

Born in Taunton, Massachusetts, Tillinghast moved to Rhode Island and pursued classical studies.
Published the Providence Gazette in 1809.
He studied law.
He was admitted to the bar in 1811 and began practice in Providence, Rhode Island.
He served as member of the State house of representatives 1826–1833, serving as speaker 1829–1832.

Tillinghast was elected as a Whig to the Twenty-fifth, Twenty-sixth, and Twenty-seventh Congresses (March 4, 1837 – March 3, 1843).
He was not a candidate for renomination.
Trustee of Brown University at Providence 1833–1844.
He died in Providence, Rhode Island, December 30, 1844.
He was interred in North Burial Ground.

He was a great great grandson of Rev. Pardon Tillinghast (1622–1718).

Sources

 'The Tillinghasts in America: The First Four Generations' by Wayne G. Tillinghast (2006), Rhode Island Genealogical Society.

External links
 

1791 births
1844 deaths
Members of the United States House of Representatives from Rhode Island
Rhode Island Whigs
Speakers of the Rhode Island House of Representatives
Whig Party members of the United States House of Representatives
19th-century American politicians
Burials at North Burying Ground (Providence)